Al-Nojoom FC is a Saudi Arabian professional sports club based in Al-Hasa, they play their home games in Prince Abdullah bin Jalawi Stadium.

Honours
Saudi Second Division
Runners-up (1): 2014–15
Saudi Third Division
Winners (1): 2012–13

Administration

Current squad 

As of Saudi Second Division:

References

Nojoom
Nojoom
Nojoom
Nojoom